The Second Government of the Lao People's Democratic Republic was established on 1 June 1989.

Ministries

Committees

References

Specific

Bibliography
Books:
 

Governments of Laos
1989 establishments in Laos
1993 disestablishments in Laos